Le Juch is a commune in the Finistère department and administrative region of Brittany in north-western France.

Population
In French the inhabitants of Le Juch are known as Juchois.

Breton language
The municipality launched a linguistic plan concerning the Breton language through Ya d'ar brezhoneg on 14 December 2005.

See also
Communes of the Finistère department

References

External links

Mayors of Finistère Association 

Communes of Finistère